Johanna is a feminine name.

Johanna may also refer to:

Places
Johanna, Victoria, a beach resort in Australia
127 Johanna, asteroid
Johanna, Culemborg, a windmill in Gelderland, Netherlands
Johanna, former name for the island of Anjouan, Comoros

Songs
"Johanna (Shut Up!)", a 2007 song from The Power of Shower by Crazy Loop
"Johanna", 2019, by Suki Waterhouse
"Johanna", 1988, by The Stooges
"Johanna", three songs in Sweeney Todd: The Demon Barber of Fleet Street

Other uses
Johanna (barge), a preserved working boat in Belgium
Johanna (East Indiaman), a British ship active c. 1671–1681
Johanna (film), a 2005 Hungarian musical
Johanna (TV series), a 1989 East German series about a Berlin tram

See also
Lake Johanna Township, Pope County, Minnesota
Johanna Kustannus, a Finnish record label
Joanna (disambiguation)
Joanne (disambiguation)